Purmerend Weidevenne is a suburban railway station, in the Weidevenne estate in Purmerend, Netherlands. The station opened on 9 December 2007 and is on the Zaandam–Enkhuizen railway. The official opening of the station was on 8 December 2007.

Train services
The following train services currently call at Purmerend Weidevenne:
2x per hour local service (sprinter) Hoofddorp - Schiphol - Zaandam - Hoorn Kersenboogerd
In the morning, afternoon and early evening the train starts in Leiden before continuing to Hoofddorp and further.

From December 2008, the direct connection with Amsterdam Centraal was lost, due to the Stoptrain 4500 becoming an Intercity, not stopping between Amsterdam Sloterdijk and Hoorn. Therefore, it is recommended to travel to Zaandam/Amsterdam Sloterdijk and change for central Amsterdam.

External links
NS website 
Dutch Public Transport journey planner 

Railway stations opened in 2007
Railway stations in North Holland
Purmerend